Xanthophyllum rufum is a plant in the family Polygalaceae. The specific epithet  is from the Latin meaning "reddish", referring to the colour of the twig hairs.

Description
The smooth bark is greenish grey or brown. The flowers are white, drying yellowish.

Distribution and habitat
Xanthophyllum rufum grows naturally in Sumatra, Peninsular Malaysia and Borneo. Its habitat is lowland mixed dipterocarp or riverine forests from sea-level to  altitude.

References

rufum
Flora of Sumatra
Flora of Peninsular Malaysia
Flora of Borneo
Plants described in 1874
Taxa named by Alfred William Bennett